Podchinny is a rural locality (a settlement) in Alyoshnikovskoye Rural Settlement, Zhirnovsky District, Volgograd Oblast, Russia. The population was 145 as of 2010. There are 4 streets.

Geography 
Podchinny is located in forest steppe of Volga Upland, 43 km southeast of Zhirnovsk (the district's administrative centre) by road. Aleshniki is the nearest rural locality.

References 

Rural localities in Zhirnovsky District
Volga German people